Nicholas Reeder  (born Nicholas Herchenroeder, March 22, 1867 – September 26, 1894) was a third baseman in Major League Baseball in the 19th century. He played in one game for the Louisville Colonels of the American Association in 1891.

On April 11, 1891, playing for the Louisville Colonels, Reeder pinch hit for Tim Shinnick and then played 3B in his only major league appearance, going 0-2 in the game.

Reeder died on September 26, 1894 in Louisville, Kentucky at age 27, while still an active player. His death was reportedly caused by "brain fever."

References

1867 births
1894 deaths
Baseball players from Kentucky
Major League Baseball third basemen
Louisville Colonels players
19th-century baseball players
Spokane Bunchgrassers players
Peoria Distillers players
Marinette (minor league baseball) players
Neurological disease deaths in Kentucky